Country Music Star No. 1 contains recordings of a prestardom Glen Campbell, which were made around 1960–1961. This album, just like the other Starday album Country Soul, was released after Campbell rose to international fame with hits including "Gentle on My Mind", "By the Time I Get to Phoenix" and "Wichita Lineman". Campbell sued against these releases but eventually settled with Starday.

Track listing
Side 1:

 "Gone But Not Forgotten" (Horton/Bryan) – 2:38
 "The Ashes Of Time" (Horton/Bryan) – 2:00
 "Groovin Country" (Horton/Bryan) – 1:45
 "No Need Of Lying" (Horton/Bryan) – 2:22
 "Talking To Myself" (Horton/Bryan) – 2:22

Side 2:

 "I'm A Fool For You" (Horton/Bryan) – 2:15
 "Why Did You Do Me This Way" (Horton/Bryan) – 2:24
 "I Need You Dear I Do" (Horton/Bryan) – 1:40
 "The Judge And Jury" (Horton/Bryan) – 2:34
 "One Of These Days" (Horton/Bryan) – 2:26

Personnel
Glen Campbell – vocals, acoustic guitar

Production
Cover design – Dan Quest Art Studio

References

1969 compilation albums
Glen Campbell compilation albums
Starday Records compilation albums